Vsetínská Bečva (formerly: Horní Bečva; German: Obere Betschwa) is a river in the Czech Republic, the left tributary of the Bečva. It originates in the Javorníky mountain range at the elevation of 896 m and flows to Valašské Meziříčí, where it joins with Rožnovská Bečva to form the river Bečva.

It flows through numerous towns and villages, including Velké Karlovice, Karolinka, Nový Hrozenkov, Halenkov, Huslenky, Hovězí, Janová, Ústí, Vsetín, Jablůnka, Pržno, Bystřička, Jarcová and Valašské Meziříčí.

Its longest tributary is the Senice.

References 

Rivers of the Zlín Region
Vsetín District